This article lists the oldest extant buildings in Nebraska, including extant buildings and structures constructed prior to and during the United States rule over Nebraska. Only buildings built prior to 1870 are suitable for inclusion on this list, or the building must be the oldest of its type.

In order to qualify for the list, a structure must:
 be a recognizable building (defined as any human-made structure used or intended for supporting or sheltering any use or continuous occupancy);
 incorporate features of building work from the claimed date to at least  in height and/or be a listed building.

This consciously excludes ruins of limited height, roads and statues. Bridges may be included if they otherwise fulfill the above criteria. Dates for many of the oldest structures have been arrived at by radiocarbon dating or dendrochronology and should be considered approximate. If the exact year of initial construction is estimated, it will be shown as a range of dates.

List of oldest buildings

See also
National Register of Historic Places listings in Nebraska
History of Nebraska
List of the oldest buildings in the United States

References

External links

Nebraska
Architecture in Nebraska
Oldest